The 2004 New York Democratic presidential primary took place on March 2, 2004, also known as Super Tuesday.

Results

* Candidate withdrew prior to primary.

See also

 2004 Democratic Party presidential primaries
 2004 New York Republican presidential primary

References

New York
2004
2004 New York (state) elections